Eliane Becks Nininahazwe is a Burundian singer and musician, who is also known for promoting AIDS/HIV awareness both in Burundi, and in the Netherlands where she now lives.

Career
Eliane Becks Nininahazwe was born and raised in Murira, Commune of Gihanga, Burundi. She was brought up during the fighting between the Hutu and Tutsi tribes, which resulted in the death of her sister during childbirth as they could not get her to a hospital. She was diagnosed with Type 1 diabetes, and suffered from hyperglycaemia. Nininahazwe managed to control her blood sugar levels through regular checks. She fell pregnant, and her boyfriend left her, but she decided to keep the child.

Four months after the birth, she met Dutchman Michael Becks, and with him moved to Angola for his work. She attended the hospital there for her diabetes when during a routine check, she was diagnosed with HIV. After a bad experience at that hospital, she sought medical treatment in South Africa. Because of the stigma against HIV in Africa, the couple hid her medication whenever they travelled across borders in that continent. They then moved to the Netherlands, where she founded her company Indonongo, named after the one stringed instrument made from a cow's horn which she plays. Such is the rarity of the instrument in the Netherlands, that she brings back parts and equipment whenever she returns to Burundi.

She has since become an AIDS/HIV activist, promoting knowledge of the issues around the disease and fighting against the stigma still prevalent in Africa. Nininahazwe continues to openly promote AIDS awareness, with her being one of roughly two hundred people promoting World AIDS Day in 2015 on the official website. As part of the celebrations in the following year, she sang at an event in the Netherlands promoting AIDS awareness and celebrating the work of the Netherlands drama No Socks No Shoes. Also in 2016, she was named one of the winners of that year's Voice Achievers Awards, winning the African Inspiration Award.

Personal life
She is married with children, and now lives in Amersfoort, Netherlands.

References

Living people
Burundian women singers
HIV/AIDS activists
21st-century women singers
21st-century dancers
Female dancers
People with type 1 diabetes
Year of birth missing (living people)